Alma Mater is a 2004 Uruguayan film directed by Álvaro Buela.

Starring Roxana Blanco, Nicolás Becerra, Werner Schünemann and Walter Reyno, it deals with the life of a virgin woman who thinks herself as the future mother of a Saviour of the World.

In 2005 it was nominated to the Goya Award for Best Iberoamerican Film.

References

External links
 

2004 films
Uruguayan drama films